The Order of Petrović Njegoš (Montenegrin: Орден Петровић Његош, Orden Petrović Njegoš) was founded by King Nikola I of Montenegro in 1896 to commemorate the 200 years of rule of the Royal House of Petrović-Njegoš.

In the same year of the foundation of the Order and Dynastic celebration, King Nicholas's fifth daughter, Princess Elena of Montenegro, married Prince Victor Emmanuel of Savoy, the heir to the Italian Throne.

The Order is given to members of the Dynasty and kinsmen exclusively. The Order was not bestowed in 1996 while Montenegro remained a non-sovereign state.

In 2008, celebrating the passage of 300 years since the first Petrović Njegoš rulers ascent, Nicholas, Crown Prince of Montenegro, bestowed the Order in recognition of this landmark.

The upper arm of the cross bears the Cyrillic initial "D" that stands for Danilo I - the first Petrović Njegoš Hereditary Bishop - and the lower one "N" for Nicholas I. The remaining two arms of the cross indicate the date of the first rule by the dynasty and of the foundation of the Order.

The Order of Petrović Njegoš is a House Order of the Royal House of Montenegro.

The Order consists of a single class.

Officers of the Order

 Grand Master : Nicholas, Crown Prince of Montenegro
 Vice-Grand Master : Boris, Hereditary Prince of Montenegro
 Grand Chancellor: Boris, Hereditary Prince of Montenegro (2012)
 Registrar
Grand Prefect

Classes and Post Nominals

 Knight/Dame (OPN)

Recipients
 Nicholas, Crown Prince of Montenegro
 Hereditary Prince Boris of Montenegro, Grand Duke of Grahavo and Zeta
 Princess Véronique of Montenegro, Grand Duchess of Grahavo and Zeta
 Princess Milena of Montenegro
 Princess Altinaï of Montenegro
 Prince Dimitri of Russia
 Vittorio Emanuele, Prince of Naples
 Emanuele Filiberto, Prince of Venice
 John Gvozdenović Kennedy

References

Dimitri Romanoff, The Orders, Medals and History of Montenegro, Rungsted 1988

External links
 Order of Petrović Njegoš

Orders, decorations, and medals of Montenegro
Petrovic Njegos
Awards established in 1896
Orders of chivalry awarded to heads of state, consorts and sovereign family members